Nisaxis is a genus of ant-loving beetles in the family Staphylinidae. There are at least four described species in Nisaxis.

Species
These four species belong to the genus Nisaxis:
 Nisaxis caudata Schaeffer, 1905
 Nisaxis maritima Casey, 1887
 Nisaxis parviceps Casey, 1897
 Nisaxis tomentosa (Aubé, 1833)

References

Further reading

 
 

Pselaphinae
Articles created by Qbugbot